Mary Price was an alleged spy.

Mary Price may also refer to:

Mary Grant Price (1917–2002), costume designer
Mary Sue Price, playwright and scriptwriter
Mary Elizabeth Price (1877–1965), American impressionist painter
Mary Violet Leontyne Price, soprano
Mary Price (bowls) (born 1942), British bowler